The Australian Chess Championship is a tournament organised by the Australian Chess Federation and held every two years. The tournament is largely restricted to Australian chess players, although it is common to allow a small number of strong overseas players to compete. The highest-scoring eligible player (frequently the tournament winner) holds the title of Australian Chess Champion until the next tournament is held. The tournament format is normally a restricted Swiss system, and in case of a tie for first place, a playoff match or tournament is conducted.

Since 1971, the Australian Open has been held in the intervening years. This event is open to all players, regardless of nationality, and the winner holds the title of Australian Open Champion.

The Australian Junior Championship and Australian Girls Championship are held annually. The Australian Women's Championship was previously organised as a separate tournament but current regulations award the title of Australian Women's Champion to the highest placed Australian female player in the Australian Open (dependent on a minimum number of female entries).

Australian Champions
Prior to 2008, the tournament usually began in late December (after Christmas) and finished in January. Since 2008, the tournament has usually been held entirely in January.  In the table, the year refers to the date the tournament finished.

{| class="sortable wikitable"
|- style="background:#cccccc;"
! Year !! Location !! Winners
|-
| 1885 || Melbourne || Frederick Karl Esling (won one match game before George Hatfeild Dingley Gossip defaulted)
|-
| 1887 || Adelaide || Henry Charlick
|-
| 1888 || Melbourne || William Crane
|-
| 1893 || Sydney ||  Albert Edward Noble Wallace
|-
| 1895 || Melbourne || Albert Edward Noble Wallace
|-
| 1896 || Sydney || Albert Edward Noble Wallace
|-
| 1897(1) || Warrnambool ||  William Crane
|-
| 1897(2) || Sydney || Julius Leigh Jacobsen
|-
| 1906 || Perth || William Samuel Viner
|-
| 1912 || Sydney || William Samuel Viner
|-
| 1913 || Bellingen || William Samuel Viner
|-
| 1922 || Melbourne || Charles Gilbert Marriott Watson
|-
| 1924 || Brisbane || William Samuel Viner
|-
| 1926 || Sydney || Spencer Crakanthorp
|-
| 1927 || Perth || Spencer Crakanthorp
|-
| 1931 || Melbourne || Charles Gilbert Marriott Watson
|-
| 1933 || Sydney || Gary Koshnitsky
|-
| 1935 || Melbourne || C.J.S. Purdy
|-
| 1937 || Perth || C.J.S. Purdy
|-
| 1939 || Sydney || Gary Koshnitsky
|-
| 1945 || Sydney || Lajos Steiner
|-
| 1947 || Adelaide || Lajos Steiner
|-
| 1949 || Melbourne || C.J.S. Purdy
|-
| 1951 || Brisbane || C.J.S. Purdy
|-
| 1953 || Hobart || Lajos Steiner
|-
| 1955 || Perth || John Purdy
|-
| 1957 || Melbourne || Karlis Ozols / Lazare Suchowolski (Suchowolski emigrated to Israel before a playoff could be arranged)
|-
| 1959 || Hobart || Lajos Steiner
|-
| 1960 || Adelaide || Lucius Endzelins
|-
| 1963 || Perth || John Purdy
|-
| 1965 || Hobart || Douglas Hamilton
|-
| 1967 || Brisbane || Douglas Hamilton
|-
| 1969 || Melbourne || Walter Browne
|-
| 1970 || Sydney || Alfred Flatow
|-
| 1972 || Melbourne || Maxwell Fuller / Trevor Hay (playoff match tied 5–5)
|-
| 1974 || Cooma || Robert Murray Jamieson
|-
| 1976 || Sydney || Serge Rubanraut
|-
| 1978 || Perth || Robert Murray Jamieson
|-
| 1980 || Adelaide || Ian Rogers
|-
| 1982 || Melbourne || Douglas Hamilton
|-
| 1984 || Sydney || Darryl Johansen
|-
| 1986 || Toowoomba || Ian Rogers
|-
| 1988 || Gosford || Darryl Johansen
|-
| 1990 || Sydney || Darryl Johansen
|-
| 1992 || Melbourne || Aleksandar Wohl
|-
| 1994 || Melbourne || John-Paul Wallace
|-
| 1996 || Sydney || Guy West
|-
| 1998 || Melbourne || Ian Rogers
|-
| 2000 || Tumbi Umbi || Darryl Johansen
|-
| 2002 || Melbourne || Darryl Johansen
|-
| 2004 || Adelaide || Gary Lane
|-
| 2006 || Brisbane || Ian Rogers
|-
| 2008 || Parramatta|| Stephen Solomon
|-
| 2010 || North Sydney || Zong-Yuan Zhao
|-
| 2012 || Geelong || Darryl Johansen
|-
| 2014 || Springvale || Max Illingworth
|-
| 2016 || Melbourne || Bobby Cheng
|-
| 2018 || North Sydney || Max Illingworth
|-
| 2020 || Sydney || Temur Kuybokarov
|-
| 2022 || Gold Coast || Temur Kuybokarov
|}

Australian Women's Champions
1966 Marion Mott-McGrath
1969 Marion Mott-McGrath
1972 Narelle Kellner
1974 Narelle Kellner
1976 Marion Mott-McGrath
1978 Lynda Pope
1980 Marion Mott-McGrath
1982 Anne Slavotinek
1984 Anne Slavotinek
1986 Josie Wright
1988 Carin Craig
1990 Josie Wright
1992 Katrin Aladjova
1994 Boglarka Remenyi, Narelle Szuveges, Liz Ports and Lee Fraser
1995 Dana Nuțu-Gajic
1996 Biljana Dekic & Ngan Phan-Koshnitsky
1998 Ngan Phan-Koshnitsky
1999 Irina Feldman
2002 Narelle Szuveges
2003 Slavica Sarai
2015 Heather Richards
2017 Alexandra Jule
2019 Julia Ryjanova
2023 Leah Rice

Australian Junior Champions 
The Australian Junior Chess Championship is a tournament organised by the Australian Chess Federation and is held every year. It is restricted to junior players under 18 years of age. The Australian Girls Championship is held concurrently.
1949 W. Levick
1951 John Purdy
1952 J. Hortovanyi
1953 Malcolm Broun
1954 D. Robson
1955 J. Hortovanyi
1956 A. Irving
1957 J. Ferguson
1958 D. Rudd
1959 Ron Klinger
1960 Peter Lay
1961 Trevor Hay
1962 N. Alexander
1963 Maxwell Fuller
1964 William Kerr
1965 William Kerr
1966 Mike Woodhams
1967 Arthur Pope
1968 Noel Craske
1969 John Hendry
1970 Alan Sauran
1971 Arthur Koelle
1972 Greg Melrose
1973 Robert Bartnik
1974 William Jordan
1975 David Dick (finished third behind Murray Chandler and Kai Jensen who were ineligible for title because they were New Zealand residents )
1976 Ian Rogers
1977 Darryl Johansen / D. Fardell
1978 Murray Smith
1979 Stephen Kerr
1980 Stephen Solomon (tied with Donald MacFarlane who was ineligible for title because he was a South African resident)
1981 Rey Casse (tied with Jonathan Sarfati who was ineligible for title because he was a New Zealand resident)
1982 Paul Broekhuyse
1983 Konrad Hornung
1984 Peter Evans
1985 Timothy Reilly
1986 Shane Hill
1987 Colin Davis
1988 Lee Jones
1989 Peter Cotton
1990 Nick Speck
1991 Lee Jones
1992 Trevor Tao
1993 John Paul Wallace
1994 Ry Curtis
1995 Charles Pizzato
1996 David Cordover
1997 Max Leskiewicz
1998 Geoff Saw
1999 David Smerdon
2000 Justin Tan
2001 Zong-Yuan Zhao
2002 Kuan-Kuan Tian
2003 Tomek Rej
2004 Denis Bourmistrov
2005 Moulthun Ly
2006 Angela Song
2007 Michael Wei
2008 Junta Ikeda 
2009 Cedric Antolis 
2010 Bobby Cheng
2011 Bobby Cheng
2012 Alistair Cameron 
2013 Gene Nakauchi
2014 Anton Smirnov
2015 Yi Liu
2016 Ari Dale
2017 Ray Yang
2018 David Cannon
2019 Sterling Bayaca
2020 Cameron McGowan
2023 Ruicheng Wang

Australian Girls Champions
1960 Irene Tannenthal
1964 Rosalind Jones
1965 Rosalind Jones
1966 Rosalind Jones
1967 Marilyn Urlick
1968 Nona Monachowec
1969 Nona Monachowec
1970 Linda Maddern
1971 Linda Maddern
1972 Lillian Goldsmith
1973 Irena Duluk
1974 Cathy Innes-Brown
1975 Cathy Innes-Brown / Cathy Depasquale / Karen Hancock
1976 Kate Marshall
1977 Anne Martin
1978 Anne Slavotinek
1979 Anne Slavotinek
1980 Astrid Ketelaar
1981 Jill Clementi
1982 Josie Wright
1983 Trudi Potter
1984 Colleen Lau
1985 Gina Soto-Olivo
1986 Natalie Mills / J. Rees / Blanche Wilkie / Nga Phan
1987 Tam Nguyen
1988 Nancy Jones
1989 Nancy Jones
1990 Gabrielle Grbovac / J. King & Barbara Remenyi / Boglarka Remenyi
1991 Boglarka Remenyi
1992 Jennifer Harrington
1993 Veronica Klimenko / I. Liubomirskaia / Narelle Szuveges
1994 Sulyn Teh
1995 Jasmine Lauer-Smith
1996 Laura Moylan
1997 Elaine Chong
1998 Kylie Coventry
1999 Catherine Lip / Jasmine Lauer-Smith / Shiloh Norris
2000 Catherine Lip
2001 Michelle Lee
2002 Shannon Oliver
2003 Angela Song
2004 Heather Huddleston
2005 Rebecca Harris
2006 Alexandra Jule
2007 Emma Guo
2008 Deborah Ng
2009 Sally Yu
2010 Leteisha Simmonds
2011 Savithri Narenthran
2012 Miranda Webb-Liddle
2013 Nicole Chin
2014 Shirley Gu
2015 Kristine Quek
2016 Zhi Lin Guo
2017 Yifan Eva Wang
2018 Cassandra Lim
2019 Jody Middleton
2020 Lillian Lu
2023 Chloe Fan

Australian Open

1971 Lajos Portisch (Hungary)
1973 Maxwell Fuller
1975 Maxwell Fuller
1977 Trevor Hay / Stewart Booth / Michael Woodhams
1979 Maxwell Fuller
1981 Robert Murray Jamieson
1983 Darryl Johansen
1985 Guy West
1987 Gyula Sax (Hungary)
1989 Aleksandar Wohl / Robin Hill
1991 Lembit Oll (Estonia) / Edvīns Ķeņģis (Latvia) / Stefan Đurić (Yugoslavia) / Darryl Johansen / Tony Miles (England)
1993 Ian Rogers
1995 Dinh Duc Trong (Vietnam)
1997 Darryl Johansen
1999 Vadim Milov (Switzerland)
2001 Stefan Đurić
2003 John-Paul Wallace
2005 Elena Sedina (Italy)
2007 Zong-Yuan Zhao
2009 Aleksandar Wohl / George Xie
2011 George Xie / Zong-Yuan Zhao / Moulthun Ly
2013 Bobby Cheng
2015 Ni Hua
2017 Max Illingworth / Temur Kuybokarov (Uzbekistan) / Kanan Izzat (Azerbaijan) / Yi Liu
2019 Temur Kuybokarov / Kanan Izzat (Azerbaijan)
2023 Temur Kuybokarov

Australian Grand Prix
Since 1989 a system has been in place with points accumulated in different Australian weekend tournaments. The winners have been:
1989 Ian Rogers
1990 Stephen Solomon
1991 Darryl Johansen
1992 Darryl Johansen
1993 Darryl Johansen
1994 Ian Rogers
1995 Darryl Johansen
1996 Darryl Johansen
1997 Stephen Solomon
1998 Ian Rogers
1999 Stephen Solomon
2000 Ian Rogers
2001 Stephen Solomon
2002 Ian Rogers
2003 Ian Rogers
2004 Ian Rogers
2005 Igor Bjelobrk
2006 George Xie
2007 Dejan Antić
2008 Stephen Solomon
2009 David Smerdon
2010 Zhao Zong-Yuan
2011 Stephen Solomon
2012 George Xie
2013 Brodie McClymont
2014 Moulthun Ly
2015 Anton Smirnov
2016 Brodie McClymont
2017 Stephen Solomon
2018 Stephen Solomon
2019 Stephen Solomon
The Grand Prix has not been held since 2019.

See also

References

. (Men's champions through 1986)
. (Men's champions through 1980)
 http://www.ozbase.com.au/ – an incomplete list, including games in PGN format.

External links
https://web.archive.org/web/20150624114332/http://2016.chesschampionship.org.au/
http://auschesschamps.com/
http://www.ajcc.org.au/ 

Chess national championships
Women's chess national championships
Championship
Chess